The 2012–13 Gardner–Webb Runnin' Bulldogs men's basketball team represented Gardner–Webb University during the 2012–13 NCAA Division I men's basketball season. The Runnin' Bulldogs, led by third year head coach Chris Holtmann, played their home games at the Paul Porter Arena and were members of the South Division of the Big South Conference. They finished the season 21–13, 11–5 in Big South play to finish in second place in the South Division. They advanced to the semifinals of the Big South tournament where they lost to Liberty. They were invited to the 2013 CIT, their first ever Division I postseason tournament, where they lost in the first round to Eastern Kentucky.

Roster

Schedule

|-
!colspan=9 style=| Regular season

|-
!colspan=9 style=| <span style=>2013 Big South Tournament

|-
!colspan=9 style=| 2013 CIT

References

Gardner–Webb Runnin' Bulldogs men's basketball seasons
Gardner-Webb
Gardner-Webb
Gardner
Gardner